Who Dares Wins II is a run and gun game developed and published by Alligata Software and released in late 1985 for the Commodore 64, as well as the Amstrad CPC, Atari 8-bit family, BBC Micro, Commodore 16, Plus/4, MSX, and ZX Spectrum.

The game is a remake of the earlier Who Dares Wins, which was given an injunction after it was accused of being too similar to Commando; Computer Gamer magazine had described Who Dares Wins as an "accurate reproduction" of Commando.

Gameplay 

The main character is a lone soldier sent into enemy territory, wielding a gun and five grenades. The player must capture eight enemy outposts against massive opposition. The player can blow up vehicles and rescue prisoners in each level. If the player takes too long, the prisoners are executed by firing squad.

Reception 
Zzap!64 rated the game a 90/100, calling the game "fantastic" and the landscapes "incredible". It revisited the game 7 years later and gave it a revised rating of 78/100, saying that "it just hasn't weathered the years too well", but that it was "still very playable".

Dion Guy of Nintendo Life called the game something he wished was on the Nintendo Virtual Console, and "a lot of fun" despite not being extremely difficult.

References

External links

Who Dares Wins II at Atari Mania

1985 video games
Single-player video games
Shooter video games
Commodore 64 games
Amstrad CPC games
Atari 8-bit family games
BBC Micro and Acorn Electron games
Commodore 16 and Plus/4 games
MSX games
Video games developed in the United Kingdom
ZX Spectrum games
Tynesoft games
Alligata games